Edwin Herbert Hall (November 7, 1855 – November 20, 1938) was an American physicist, who discovered the eponymous Hall effect. Hall conducted thermoelectric research and also wrote numerous physics textbooks and laboratory manuals.

Biography 
Hall was born in Gorham, Maine, U.S. Hall did his undergraduate work at Bowdoin College, Brunswick, Maine, graduating in 1875. He was the principal of Gould Academy in 1875–1876 and the principal of Brunswick High School in 1876–1877. He did his graduate schooling and research, and earned his Ph.D. degree (1880), at the Johns Hopkins University where his seminal experiments were performed.

The Hall effect was discovered by Hall in 1879, while working on his doctoral thesis in Physics under the supervision of Henry Augustus Rowland. Hall's experiments consisted of exposing thin gold leaf (and, later, using various other materials) on a glass plate and tapping off the gold leaf at points down its length. The effect is a potential difference (Hall voltage) on opposite sides of a thin sheet of conducting or semiconducting material (the Hall element) through which an electric current is flowing. This was created by a magnetic field applied perpendicular to the Hall element. The ratio of the voltage created to the amount of current is known as the Hall resistance, and is a characteristic of the material in the element. In 1880, Hall's experimentation was published as a doctoral thesis in the American Journal of Science and in the Philosophical Magazine.

Hall was appointed as a professor of physics at Harvard in 1895, and succeeded John Trowbridge as Rumford Professor of Physics in 1914. Hall retired in 1921 and died in Cambridge, Massachusetts, U.S. in 1938.

The Hall effect is used in magnetic field sensors, present in a large number of devices, as well as high efficiency electric propulsion systems on spacecraft.

In the presence of large magnetic field strength and low temperature, one can observe the quantum Hall effect, which is the quantization of the Hall resistance. This is now the official standard for electrical resistance.

Works 
He made various contributions to scientific journals on the thermal conductivity of iron and nickel, the theory of thermoelectric action, and on thermoelectric heterogeneity in metals. His publications include:  
 A Text-Book of Physics (1891; third edition, 1903), with J. Y. Bergen
 Elementary Lessons in Physics (1894; 1900)
 The Teaching of Chemistry and Physics (1902), with Alexander Smith
 College Laboratory Manual of Physics (1904; revised edition, 1913)
 Elements of Physics (1912)

See also
 Hall effect
 Henry Augustus Rowland
 Scientific phenomena named after people

Relevant lists 
 List of eponyms
 List of physicists

References

External links
 Katz, Eugenii, "Hall". Biosensors & Bioelectronics.
 The President and Fellows of Harvard College, "Hall, Edwin Herbert, 1855–1938. Papers: Guide.". Houghton Library, Harvard College Library, Harvard University, Cambridge, MA. 2002.
 "Edwin Hall image". aip.org.
 Hall, Edwin, "On a New Action of the Magnet on Electric Currents". American Journal of Mathematics vol. 2 pp. 287–292, 1879.
 

1855 births
1938 deaths
American physicists
Hall effect
People from Gorham, Maine
Bowdoin College alumni
Johns Hopkins University alumni
Harvard University faculty
Burials at Mount Auburn Cemetery